The name Warren has been used for two tropical cyclone in the Western Pacific Ocean and for one in the Australian region of the South Pacific Ocean.

In the Western Pacific:
 Tropical Storm Warren (1981) (T8117, 21W)
 Tropical Storm Warren (1984) (T8425, 26W, Reming)

In the Australian region:
 Tropical Cyclone Warren (1995), made landfall in Northern Australia. 

Pacific typhoon set index articles
Australian region cyclone set index articles